Sergey Lebedev, Sergei Lebedev, Sergej Lebedev, Sergei Lebedew,  or  may refer to:

Sergey Lebedev (chess player) (1868–1942), Russian chess player
Sergey Lebedev (chemist) (1874–1934), Russian chemist
Sergey Lebedev (scientist) (1902–1974), Russian electrical engineer and computer scientist
Sergey Lebedev (politician) (born 1948), Uzbekistan-born Russian politician
Sergey Lebedev (footballer) (born 1969), Uzbekistan-born Soviet association football midfielder
Sergei Lebedev (novelist), nominated for the 2021 Jan Michalski Prize